Freaked Out Flower Children were an Australian band which formed in 1991 with actress and TV presenter, Sophie Lee, on saxophone and vocals. Other members were Gumpy Phillips (ex-Battle Happy, Mighty Big Crime) on guitar and vocals; Tricky J (Mighty Big Crime) on synthesiser; Fiona Ruttelle on backing vocals; and Nicole Love on backing vocals. They played 1960s-style flower power music. Their debut single "Spill the Wine" – a cover version of Eric Burdon and War's 1970 hit – reached No. 31 on the ARIA Singles Chart in 1992. In December 1991 the group issued their debut album, Love In, on Virgin Records, which was "full of syncopated beats and breezy melodies". A second single, "Beautiful People" was issued. However the group's "retro-cabaret and day-glo focus ... did little to foster a sense of longevity". They disbanded in 1993.

Members
 Gumpy Phillips – Guitar, vocals
 Tricky J – Synthesiser programming
 Sophie Lee – Saxophone, vocals
 Nicole Love – backing vocals
 Fiona Ruttelle – backing vocals

Discography

Studio albums

Singles

References

Australian rock music groups
Musical groups established in 1991
Musical groups disestablished in 1993